Tessmannia densiflora is a species of legume in the family Fabaceae. It is found only in Tanzania. It is threatened by habitat loss.

References

Detarioideae
Flora of Tanzania
Endangered plants
Taxonomy articles created by Polbot